State Road 278 (NM 278) is a  state highway in the US state of New Mexico. NM 278's southern terminus is at NM 209 west of Grady, and the northern terminus is at Frontage Road 4118 (FR 4118) and Historic US 66 east of Tucumcari.

History

NM 278 was created in the 1988 renumbering and was originally a segment of NM 88. In the 1930s this section was NM 87 but was made into an extension of NM 88 to avoid confusion between NM 87 and US 87.

Major intersections

See also

References

278
Transportation in Quay County, New Mexico